Typha changbaiensis  is a plant species native to the Changbai Mountains in the Jilin province of northeastern China. It grows in freshwater marshes.

References

changbaiensis
Freshwater plants
Plants described in 2000
Endemic flora of China
Flora of Jilin